Royston United F.C. was an English association football club based in Royston, South Yorkshire, Barnsley, South Yorkshire.

History
The club competed in the FA Cup in the early 1900s.

League and cup history

Records
Best FA Cup performance: 3rd qualifying round, 1901–02, 1902–03

References

Defunct football clubs in South Yorkshire
Defunct football clubs in England